The phrase "Tom, Dick, and Harry" is a placeholder for unspecified people. The phrase most commonly occurs as "every Tom, Dick, and Harry", meaning everyone, and "any Tom, Dick, or Harry", meaning anyone, although Brewer's Dictionary of Phrase and Fable defines the term to specify "a set of nobodies; persons of no note".

Similar expressions exist in other languages of the world, using commonly used first or last names. The phrase is used in numerous works of fiction.

Origin
The origin of the phrase is unknown. The earliest known citation is from the 17th-century English theologian John Owen who used the phrase in 1657. Owen told a governing body at Oxford University that "our critical situation and our common interests were discussed out of journals and newspapers by every Tom, Dick and Harry." Pairs of common male names, particularly Jack and Tom, Dick and Tom, or Tom and Tib, were often used generically in Elizabethan times. For example, a variation of the phrase can be found in Shakespeare's Henry IV, Part 1 (1597): "I am sworn brother to a leash of Drawers, and can call them by their names, as Tom, Dicke, and Francis."

The phrase is a rhetorical device known as a tricolon. The most common form of tricolon in English is an ascending tricolon, and as such the names are always said in order of ascending syllable length. Other examples of this gradation include "tall, dark, and handsome", "hook, line, and sinker", "The Good, the Bad, and the Ugly", "lock, stock, and barrel"; and so on.

In medicine 
English-speaking medical students use the phrase in memorizing the order of an artery, and a nerve, and the three tendons of the flexor retinaculum in the lower leg: the T, D, A, N and H of Tom, Dick, and Harry correspond to tibialis posterior, flexor digitorum longus, posterior tibial artery, tibial nerve,
and flexor hallucis longus. This mnemonic is used to remember the order of the tendons from anterior to posterior at the level of the medial malleolus just posterior to the malleolus.

A variation of this is Tom Dick And Very Nervous Harry. This corresponds to Tibialis, Digitorum, Artery, Vein, (tibial)Nerve, Hallucis.

Cultural influences
Tom, Dick and Harry is widely used, so it is beyond the scope of this article to list every passing mention. However, some notable instances include:

 The three Galapagos Island tortoises brought back to England aboard  by Charles Darwin in 1835, as documented in his book, The Voyage of the Beagle. They were named Tom, Dick, and Harry. It was later discovered that "Harry" was female, so she was renamed "Harriet" and lived in captivity in Australia until her death in 2006, aged 175 years.
 In The Black Arrow: A Tale of the Two Roses, Robert Louis Stevenson refers to a general muster as calling up Dick, Tom, and Harry.
 In the television series 3rd Rock from the Sun, the three lead male characters were called Tommy, Dick and Harry.
 In 1948, the Cole Porter musical Kiss Me, Kate premiered on Broadway, featuring the song Tom, Dick, or Harry.
 The three escape tunnels used by allied POWs in the famous Stalag Luft III escape were named "Tom, Dick, and Harry" by the POWs. This nomenclature was carried over to the film The Great Escape, which portrayed the event.
 In 1942, Merrie Melodies released The Dover Boys, which starred the protagonists "Tom, Dick, and Larry", a play on the term.

See also

Notes and references

Placeholder names
English phrases
17th-century neologisms
Anonymity pseudonyms